Laurence Eliot Bunker (June 27, 1902 - October 10, 1977) was an American Army Colonel, who served as aide-de-camp to Gen. Douglas MacArthur, from 1946 - 1952.

Early life and education 
Bunker was born and raised in Wellesley Hills, Massachusetts, where he lived his entire life at the family home on Chestnut Street. His parents were Clarence Alfred Bunker, an attorney at the prominent Boston law firm of Fish, Richardson, & Storrow, and Cordelia Mitchell (Barker) Bunker. He attended Roxbury Latin School, and later graduated from Harvard University in 1926. He subsequently received a Juris Doctor from New York Law School in 1938. During the interim, he also obtained degrees at Cambridge University in England.

Career 
Bunker joined the Army in 1942, shortly after the American entry into the Second World War. His first assignment was as aide-de-camp to Gen. Richard Marshall in Australia. In April 1946 he then joined the staff of Gen. MacArthur, serving through most of the Occupation of Japan and the Korean War. Shortly after leaving MacArthur's staff in November 1952, Col. Bunker retired from the armed forces.

He went on to practice law in Wellesley Hills. In 1958, he was one of the eleven original founding members of the John Birch Society, alongside Robert W. Welch Jr., Fred C. Koch, and Revilo P. Oliver, among others. He remained a member of the National Council of the JBS, the society's top governing body, through the end of his life.

Death 
Bunker died of cancer at New England Baptist Hospital, on October 10, 1977.

He is buried, with other members of the Bunker family, at Woodlawn Cemetery in Wellesley Hills.

References

External links 
Col. Laurence E. Bunker Oral History Interview, Harry S. Truman Presidential Library
an audio recording of Col. Bunker, wherein he announces that Gov. George Wallace of Alabama, would be unable to attend the 1971 New England Rally for God, Country, and Family

1902 births
1977 deaths
20th-century American lawyers
Harvard College alumni
John Birch Society members
Massachusetts lawyers
Military personnel from Massachusetts
New York Law School alumni
People from Wellesley, Massachusetts
United States Army officers
United States Army personnel of the Korean War
United States Army personnel of World War II